Lindridge/Martin Manor is an intown neighborhood of Atlanta, Georgia. It consists mostly of the single-family homes located off Lindbergh Drive in between I-85 and Cheshire Bridge Road. In addition, it includes a small commercial area of three streets west of I-85 bounded by Peachtree Creek, Piedmont Road and the Southern railroad. The neighborhood's boundaries are I-85 on the northwest (except for the small area across I-85), Morningside-Lenox Park on the south, and North Druid Hills in unincorporated DeKalb County, Georgia on the east.

Government
The neighborhood is part of Neighborhood planning unit F. The neighborhood association is the Lindridge/Martin Manor Neighborhood Association (LMMNA). The LMMNA participates together with the neighboring North Druid Hills communities of LaVista Park and Woodland Hills in the Lindbergh LaVista Corridor Coalition (LLCC).

Issues
In 2011, issues facing Lindridge/Martin Manor included:
 the planned Clifton Corridor transit line which passes through the neighborhood on its route from Lindbergh to Emory University
 traffic congestion in particular at the intersection of Cheshire Bridge Road and Lindbergh Road/LaVista Road

References

External links
Lindridge/Martin Manor Neighborhood Association
History of Lindridge/Martin Manor
Lindbergh LaVista Corridor Coalition (LLCC)

Neighborhoods in Atlanta